"Leap Day" is the 17th episode of the third season of the American sitcom Modern Family, and the series' 65th episode overall. It aired on February 29, 2012. The episode was written by Danny Zuker and directed by Gail Mancuso.

Plot
It is February 29, a.k.a. Leap Day, and it is also Cameron's (Eric Stonestreet) birthday. He is turning 40, but as his birth date, being Leap Day, only occurs once every four years, he likes to think he is turning 10. Mitchell (Jesse Tyler Ferguson) is extremely pressured to arrange the perfect party for him and has planned a Wizard of Oz-themed party and sets everything up while Cameron is away. However, when Cameron comes back home, he tells Mitchell that he will be busy for most of the day talking to his family in the aftermath of the deadliest tornado that hit his hometown. Realizing the Wizard of Oz is famous for a tornado, Mitchell abruptly cancels the Wizard of Oz-themed party and is forced to come up with a different party idea within a couple of hours.

Meanwhile, Phil (Ty Burrell) is especially excited about Leap Day that he takes the day off from work to do something fun with his family. Claire (Julie Bowen) decides to sign the family up for a trapeze class at a local amusement park. However, Claire gets on her menstrual cycle and Phil gets horrified when Haley (Sarah Hyland) and Alex (Ariel Winter) get on their cycles as well. Thinking their moody behavior will ruin his day, Phil conspires with Luke (Nolan Gould) and Manny (Rico Rodriguez) to go to the trapeze class without the girls, telling the boys not to mention the cycle. Phil has Luke pretend that he is similarly feeling under the weather like the girls, but this backfires as Claire - knowing what Phil is doing, and fed up with his lack of empathy and unwillingness to have an open conversation with her about menstruation - insists Luke stay home, prompting Manny to go home. Phil decides to have Luke feign a cut on his finger using fake blood so they can have an excuse to leave the house to go to the doctor. Luke accidentally spills most of the container on himself. When Claire finds the container of fake blood, Luke is forced to admit that Phil wanted to leave the girls home due to their menstrual cycles (which he mispronounces). All three women are disgusted and Claire berates Phil.

Jay (Ed O'Neill) and Gloria (Sofía Vergara) go to a bar to cheer on a soccer game. When one of the patrons gets competitive with Gloria, Jay takes her away to another table to avoid confrontation. Gloria wishes that Jay fought the patron and his manliness comes into question, even more so when he puts on a pink robe, which was originally white before his white clothes got mixed with red ones in the laundry. However, when Javier disappoints Manny by once again cancelling an arranged trip with him, Gloria decides she prefers Jay being reasonable.

Mitchell decides to throw a last minute birthday cruise for Cameron, with Jay's family, the Dunphy family, and others in attendance. However, the captain (John DiMaggio) says that six of them will not be able to get onto the boat as the group is too big and that it was the biggest boat they could get within two hours. Cameron now believes Mitchell waited to arrange his party at the last second, while Gloria tries to reason with the captain, but the Captain gets confrontational with her, prompting Jay to get confrontational with him. Gloria tells him to calm down, saying she prefers that he's calm and reasonable. When the captain makes a remark about Jay's age, an angry Gloria responds by punching him in the face. As a result, the captain refuses to let any of them onto the boat and threatens to call the police, while Cameron walks away upset. When Phil mentions Cameron's sadness to Claire, she berates him over his understanding of emotions. Phil responds that it has been an emotional day for him as well because he could not do what he wanted, prompting the girls to give him a hug.

When Mitchell tries to explain what happened to Cameron, Cameron berates him for being unable to throw a decent 10th birthday, to which Mitchell reminds him that he is actually 40. Cameron breaks down, and Mitchell sees that his sadness is over the fact that he is 40 and wanted to be 10 for his birthday. When Phil mentions to them all he wanted was to go to the amusement park, Mitchell decides to take Cameron there where the two have a great time. The Dunphy family also goes, where the girls use their menstrual anger to pressure the trapeze attendant to allow Phil on. The girls let their anger out playing Whac-A-Mole.

Reception

Ratings
In its original American broadcast, "Leap Day" was watched by 11.68 million; up 0.14 million from the previous episode.

Reviews
"Leap Day" received positive reviews.

Leigh Raines from TV Fanatic gave the episode 4/5 saying that "The episode was like a ball of tension, under a weight of pressure, occurring during the time of the month for three feisty women. Or Satan's trifecta, according to Phil. Since the combined levels of screaming between Claire, Haley and Alex have left me with residual anxiety, I would say that Phil was pretty accurate."

Christine N. Ziemba of Paste Magazine gave the episode 9/10 saying that Leap Day should be turned into a national holiday, thanks to Phil Dunphy and Cam Tucker. "With “Leap Day,” this show made us do something that we haven't done many times throughout the season—laugh out loud—a lot. It's too bad that every day can't be Leap Day for Modern Family."

Cory Worrell of Ape Donkey gave a good review to the episode saying that "Leap Day" may be the best one of the season's episodes yet. "So many great moments in “Leap Day” including a candidate for line of the year courtesy of one Phil Dunphy, “Like when Wolfman, Dracula and Frankenstein showed up in the same movie....except this wasn't awesome!!” “Leap Day” was just pure, unadulterated hilarity."

Shayelizatrotter of The Comedy Critic gave an A− rate to the episode stating that "Modern Family” took advantage of the opportunity [of a holiday day] to produce a more than amusing episode. "Overall, “Leap Day” was an episode that made a rather bizarre holiday into something quite funny!"

Despite the general positive reviews, Phil Dyess-Nugent from The A.V. Club gave a C+ rate to the episode saying: "Tonight's episode wasn't the show at its best, and it demonstrated just how pointless this skillfully polished comedy projectile can feel when it really loses its direction in the course of an episode and spends the bulk of half an hour aimlessly wandering the parking lot. It also demonstrated just how second-hand it can feel when it fails to put its stamp on the ideas it's borrowed from feistier shows."

Accolades
Jesse Tyler Ferguson submitted this episode for consideration due to his nomination for the Primetime Emmy Award for Outstanding Supporting Actor in a Comedy Series at the 64th Primetime Emmy Awards.

References

External links

"Leap Day" at ABC.com

2012 American television episodes
Modern Family (season 3) episodes
Television episodes about birthdays